During the 1973–74 season S.S. Lazio competed in Serie A, Coppa Italia and UEFA Cup.

Summary 
Back to Serie A in 1973, Lazio immediately emerged as surprise challengers for the Scudetto to Milan and Juventus previous season, only losing out on the final day of the season, with a team comprising captain Giuseppe Wilson, as well as midfielders Luciano Re Cecconi and Mario Frustalupi, striker Giorgio Chinaglia who led the top Italian league in scoring with 24 goals, and head coach Tommaso Maestrelli. Lazio improved such successes this season, ensuring its first title in 74 years. 
   

In UEFA Cup the team advanced to the second round. Then they faced English squad Ipswich Town in a bizarre series they never forget. Lazio came to Portman Road for the first leg. Coach Tommaso Maestrelli made changes to tighten his defence. They backfired. Ipswich established a 4–0 lead with Trevor Whymark scoring all four goals. The fourth was hotly disputed by the angry Italians who claimed that Whymark had handled the ball. It was a rugged match. 

Sightseeing in Rome went smoothly for the return leg. It was when Ipswich had their first training session in Rome that the flames of Lazio fury were ignited. A delegation from the AC Roma supporters, Lazio's big rivals, arrived to make a presentation with Press photographers present. Pietro Magliocchetti, their president, handed Whymark a trophy with the following inscription. "To Whymark in recognition of Ipswich v Lazio 4-0. Il Roma Club FC 12" Giallorossa, with affection and gratitude.
There was an atmosphere of intimidation in the Olympic Stadium. Whymark took a blow to the head early on and Bryan Hamilton later admitted that he was "genuinely scared" by Lazio's physical and violent approach.

Lazio opened the scoring in 43 seconds and added another in nine minutes. A third goal after 26 minutes brought the Italians back into the game. They were pegged back after 73 minutes when Dutch referee Leo van der Kroft awarded what Lazio felt was a soft penalty after Clive Woods had been tripped. Colin Viljoen calmly converted the spot kick. Whymark went to congratulate him and was chased back into his own goalmouth by enraged Lazio players.

Giorgio Chinaglia, the Lazio captain and super star, scored a penalty in the 82nd minute to set up a tense finish although the Italians had to score two more because of the away-goal rule. Johnson was on the bench. He was spat on by an Italian which made him determined to play his part on the field despite his injury which had not fully healed.

In injury-time Johnson scored for Ipswich to clinch a 6-4 overall success. 

The Lazio fans got onto the pitch despite a metal fence and a moat. They threw full beer cans and lighted rockets at the Police who used tear gas in a forlorn effort to maintain control. The Italian Press had a heading "Thugs of the Olimpico" and "Madness at Stadio Olimpico." 

The riot proved ever so costly for Lazio. That season they went on to win the Scudetto but were banned by UEFA from playing in the European Cup.

Squad

Competitions

Serie A

Results by round

League table

Matches

Coppa Italia

First round

Group 2

Second round

Group B

UEFA Cup

First round

Second round

Statistics

Players statistics

References 

S.S. Lazio seasons
Lazio
Italian football championship-winning seasons